The eleventh season of Pakistani music television series Coke Studio, titled as Coke Studio: The Sound of Nation, premiered in Pakistan on 10 August 2018. Musicians Ali Hamza and Zohaib Kazi were announced as a new producers and directors for the series, after Strings stepped down from the role to pursue their own music. The series was produced under Kazi and Hamza's production company Front Foot Media and was distributed by The Coca-Cola Company Pakistan.

As a part of new module, Kazi and Hamza created a spin-off series Coke Studio Explorer which was released on 3 July 2018 and featured regional but largely unknown artists across the country where their performances were recorded live. The series opened to rave reviews and received critical acclaim. Despite the success of Explorer series, season eleven, received mixed reception from the critics.

The ninth and last episode was released on 19 October 2018. The season consisted of 30 tracks plus one promo song.

Artists

Featured artists
The following is a list of thirty-nine artists (seventy individuals) including eight bands, five duos and twenty-six solo artists.
          
 Ali Sethi
 Humaira Arshad
 Gul Panrra
 Rachel Viccaji
 Asim Azhar
 Asrar
 Abrar-ul-Haq
 Aima Baig
 Abida Parveen
 Shuja Haider
 Sahir Ali Bagga
 Momina Mustehsan
 Ali Azmat
 Attaullah Khan Esakhelvi
 Sanwal Esakhelvi
 Hassan Jahangir
 Young Desi (Mufassir)
 Lucky & Naghma
 Haniya Aslam
 Ahad Raza Mir
 Natasha Baig
 Zarsanga
 Sounds of Kolachi
 Chand Tara Orchestra 
 Mughal-e-Funk
 The Sketches
 Khumariyaan
 Jimmy Khan
 Lyari Underground (L.U.G)
 Fareed Ayaz and co.
 Krewella
 Ariana & Amrina
 Mishal Khawaja
 Mangal, Darehan & Shayan
 Shami Bai & Vishnu
 Riaz Qadri & Ghulam Qadri
 Bilal Khan
 Jawad Ahmad
 Elizabeth Rai

Musicians
The following are the musicians for the season:

Production

Development
After producing four seasons, Bilal Maqsood and Faisal Kapadia of Strings left the show to continue their own music, and Coke Studio Season 10 was the last season prodeced by them. After Strings departure, it was earlier reported that Noori will take charge as a new producers, however their publicist denied such reports.

In March 2018, Coca-Cola Pakistan announced Ali Hamza and Zohaib Kazi would helm the production and direction of eleventh season. Coca-Cola officially released a statement saying that "both Coke Studio veterans" have played "an instrumental role in its success over the years. We cannot wait to share their brilliance with all of you" in the "new chapter of the Coke Studio" journey. Fahad Qadir who is a director of public Affairs and communications of Coca-Cola, revealed on approaching Kazi and Hamza saying, "I think it was a natural evolution. Rohail Hyatt came to a point where he thought change was good" and "he brought Coke Studio where it is today. Strings had a different sound and brought in a different bag of producers. […] These are the producers we feel have the right blend, the experience, the history with Coke Studio the understanding of Coke Studio to take it to the next level."

In July 2018, Arab News revealed that Hamza and Kazi had first met in August 2017 in Lahore, two months before they were approached for the show. Kazi recounts, "that was the first time we connected on a personal level", while Hamza told, "We sat down to talk very specifically about this opportunity", and within minutes "I truly felt I had known Zohaib for a long time." They told Dawn Images in an interview that before they "started speaking to Coca-Cola", they "talked generally, about life and people and Pakistan". They had long discussions about the responsibility that Coke Studio had to be spread across the country to attract both; urban and rural areas; as "the regions and its people collectively make Pakistan."

The series went into production in April 2018 and finished filming the following month at Karachi. Post-production took place in June and July at Front Food Media in Lahore.

Coke Studio Explorer

As a part of a new module, a spin-off series Coke Studio Explorer was created before the launch of season, on a concept similar to Kazi's previous work on his album Fanoos that featured relatively unknown artists across the country where recordings were done live and edited later. In an interview to Daily Times by the duo, Kazi explained, "in Fanoos, we limited ourselves to recording musicians on location. We do much more in Coke Studio Explorer by highlighting the culture, stories and ethos behind the music. After presenting the musicians in their home locations, we bring them to our studios" to record in traditional Coke Studio style too. Hamza said, "we established the criteria for selection before embarking on our search for musicians", they "had to be talented" and had "to represent a unique aspect of the culture, history and spirit of Pakistan." The duo developed a special mobile recording system for the on-location recordings and while additional tracks and engineering was completed in studio.

The duo travelled in all four provinces and Kashmir to find artists that were known in their native regions but were unknown to mainstream media. The duo discovered a sixteen-year old pair of Amrina and Ariana from Kalash, Chitral, the brother-sister duo of Vishnu and Shamu Bai from Deewan Lal Chand a village in interior Sindh, while from Sohbatpur District, Balochistan they found throat-singers Mangal, Darehan and Shayan (now known as Bloach Throat singers), a fusion band Qasamir led by Altaf Mir with Ghulam Mohammad Daar, Manzoor Ahmed Khan, Saifuddin Shahfrom from Muzaffarabad, Azad Kashmir, and the fifth and final collaboration was with Mishal Khawaja a Pakistani born-Canadian singer, who was discovered through her Instagram covers.

The Explorer series has received largely positive reviews from critics, with particular praise given to its new module, diversity, performances and Coke Studio efforts in showcasing and bringing the indigenous art form of Pakistan to the mainstream media.

Debutants and comebacks
Among thirty-nine artists, fifteen musicians debut with season eleven including seven bands, five duos, and three solo artists. Actor and singer Ahad Raza Mir, Lahore-based rapper Young Desi; singer Elizabeth Rai (who is particularly known for her song in the film Teri Meri Love Story) and Illinois-based duo Jahan and Yasmine Yousaf of Krewella made their debuts. Four of five artists from Coke Studio Explorer series appeared in the season, while singers Riaz Qadri and Ghulam Qadri along with hip-hop band L.U.G (Lyari UnderGround), who previously worked with Kazi on his album Fanoos, also made their debuts.

For the first time in the history of Coke Studio, two transgender singers, Naghma and Lucky were included as featured artists. Their appearance received overwhelming response from media critics and people. Several featured artists returned from previous seasons as well, including Humera Arshad who was on hiatus before appearing in the tenth season. Arshad remarked, "this will be the beginning of a new phase for me in my singing career."

Release
First episode was screened in a special event at Pearl-Continental Hotel in Lahore, attended by Coke Studio team, artists and notable personalities including Allama Iqbal's family. During the release the marketing director Abbas Arslan revealed the show features "12 languages, 35 instruments with 70 artists who've composed more than 40 songs." Stating further he said, "Ali and Zohaib travelled 5500 kilometers" to discover "Explorer artists" that were included in the season. Sharing on how they wanted to be season-eleven Kazi said, "music is a powerful tool to spread a message so this is ours to the world. From Hunza to Karachi we have many gems and we must find pride in them all". After the Friday release of webisode, these were broadcast on Saturday on radio stations and television channels of Pakistan.

Promo song
Preceding the release of season, as a part of a traditional format, Coke Studio revealed this year featured artists performing a rendition of popular nazm, "Hum Dekhenge" by poet Faiz Ahmed Faiz, originally recorded by Iqbal Bano. The promo song also manifests the nation's political situation in the midst of general elections. On continuing the tradition of title song, Kazi and Hamza said that this season's journey of began with Coke Studio Explorer, "we couldn't be more confident about the power of human stories coming together to form a bigger picture", so "there couldn't be a better choice for a track than: "Hum Dekhenge" – A song by sung the people of Pakistan, for the people of Pakistan!" The song was well received by critics and public.

Episodes

Critical reviews

Television critic Shaheer Anwar of The Express Tribune said, "the duo promised to bring a new flavour to the traditional Coke Studio and seem to have accomplished their goal so far by introducing Coke Studio Explorer. This is what many are calling a bonus to the upcoming season that aims to discover musical talent from all across Pakistan." Actor turned musician Arshad Mehmud said, "the new season of Coke Studio comes with a message of love, unity, passion and pride that is exceedingly relevant to the current times. It should be heard, savoured and celebrated." Forbes contributor journalist, Sonya Rehman from Lahore remarked, "Coke Studio'''s previous seasons have dealt with its fair share of criticism and mixed reactions over certain song selections and collaborations, gauging by Coke Studio Explorer, it may just hit all the right notes this year." The season has been praised for its diversity and inclusion of new artists, Ali Samoo wrote, "this season seems to have made a very strong effort to cast an all-inclusive and representative musical spirit, painting a vibrant picture of Pakistan for the world to see. It is perhaps to show us how togetherness is what makes us beautiful, to prevent a divide and to convey solidarity amongst the nationals. The culturally pluralist amalgamation was perhaps made also to make the election time a bit more peaceful." However, season eleven received mixed reception from critics and public, criticizing the quality of music as compared to previous seasons. Imane Babar Wahedi of The Express Tribune was more critical of the show saying, "the producers focus on delivering decent performances, rather than trying too hard to be innovative," she further said, "their efforts have been praiseworthy in terms of bringing diversity to Coke Studio, but on a separate note, they shouldn't be neglecting the quality of their music."

The first episode received mixed reception from critics and publications; it was praised for its diversity both in music and casting, but it was critically reviewed for its quality of music. Writing for The Express Tribune, Ramsha Vistro remarked, "the episode managed to display an array of formations and stood for change featuring transgenders and an all-female band. I think it's safe to say, Coke Studio's latest offering did not fail to make a mark." The songs "Main Irada" and "Shika/Jawab-e-Shikwa" received critical acclaim. Second episode contained a mix of traditional and modern rendition of songs receiving mixed reception from the critics. Rahul Aijaz of The Express Tribune quipped, "Hamza and Kazi are surely bringing a change to Coke Studio. They get full points for innovation. But overall, the sound isn't mature enough yet. I can't decide whether it's because the producers are trying too hard or because they are more concerned about implementing their ideology, even if that compromises on the music." Episode three garnered positive reception, with particular praise was given to Fareed Ayaz and Abu Muhammad performance of "Piya Ghar Aya", while Express Tribune concluded the episode with moderate reception saying, "after what was a generally disappointing start to the season, Coke Studio is somewhat back on track with episode three. The Esakhelvi duo brought something fresh, Fareed Ayaz, Abu Muhammad Qawwal and Brothers gave us a taste of what we originally loved about the show, and Bagga topped it all off with a melody nostalgic of an era long gone. The song "Roye Roye" achieved mixed reception among the third episode, some praising the song as "nostalgic revival of old school melodies", and some complained it for its "clichéd lyrics", Maheen Sabeeh of The News International'' bemoaned "a song that's a bit too long and in the end sounds like a pop ditty gone awry with equally tedious lyrics and every instrument thrown on the board, for example, a weeping flute. It's a bit like suffering to listen to this suffering ballad of a song." Episode four also drew mixed reception, however, Chand Tara Orchestra's performance received critical acclaim, while the other two songs "Aatish" and "Mahi Aaja" received moderate reception.

Notes and references

Notes

References

External links
 
 

Season11
2018 Pakistani television seasons